The 2023 Women's Revelations Cup will be the second edition of the Women's Revelations Cup, an international women's football tournament, consisting of a series of friendly games, that will be held in León, Mexico from 15 to 21 February 2023. The four national teams involved in the tournament registered a squad of 23 players.

The age listed for each player is as 15 February 2023, the inauguration day of the tournament. The numbers of caps and goals listed for each player do not include any matches played after the start of tournament. A flag is included for coaches that are of a different nationality than their own national team.

Squads

Colombia
Coach: Nelson Abadía

The squad was announced on 7 February 2023. On 13 February 2023, Leicy Santos withdrew from the squad due to a hamstring injury, and was replaced by María Camila Reyes.

Costa Rica
Coach: Amelia Valverde

The squad was announced on 9 February 2023. On 13 February 2023, María Paula Porras withdrew due to injury and was replaced by Yaniela Arias.

Mexico
Coach:  Pedro López

The squad was announced on 8 February 2023. On 14 February 2023, the day before the beginning of the tournament, Celeste  Espino withdrew due to an injury and was replaced by Cecilia Santiago.

Nigeria
Coach:  Randy Waldrum

The squad was announced on 26 January 2023.

Player representation

By club
Clubs with 3 or more players represented are listed.

By club nationality

By club federation

By representatives of domestic league

References

2023 Women's Revelations Cup
2022–23 in Mexican football
2023 in women's association football
2023 squads